Bhargavi Chirmuley is a Marathi actress. She has worked in many Marathi movies and television serials. Bhargavi has always been outstanding among the Marathi actors of today's generation. Besides doing serious kind of roles in movies like Kass and One Room Kitchen, she also worked in the reality show (comedy) Fu Bai Fu (3re parv).

Early life and education
Bhargavi was born to Shirish and Sai Chirmuley. She is brought up in Mumbai-Girgaon. Later her family moved to Dadar. She completed her school in Raja Shivaji Vidyalaya. She is a graduate from Ruparel College (Mumbai). She has learnt classical dance form "Bharat Natyam". She is also a yoga therapist. She has younger sister Chaitrali (actress who is wife of actor Lokesh Gupte). In 2015, she had her 2nd divorce.

Career
Chirmule started working in small plays and dramas when she was doing graduation in Ruparel. She got her first movie break in Vishwa Vinayak. In 2010, she worked with big Marathi actors like Sachin (actor) Pilgaonkar, Mahesh Kothare and Ashok Saraf in the movie Ideachi Kalpana. She says "I would like to be known as actress rather than star." Chirmule participated and won the reality show Eka Peksha Ek (Celebrity Parv), hosted by Adesh Bandekar and judged by Sachin (actor). She also joined the show on 20 April 2011 Eka Peksha Ek (Apsara Aali) as guest. In 2011, she worked with Bharat Jadhav in the movie One Room Kitchen, in which she played a middle-class housewife, who is living in a chawl, but dreaming about having a flat in a suburban area of Mumbai. In 2012, she played in a drama named Zopi Gelela Jag Zala. Currently, she is doing the sitcom Suvasini, which telecasts on Star Pravah. She also played Queen Sunayna, mother of Sita in the TV serial Siya ke Ram, aired on Star Plus.

Filmography

Films

Television

Drama/Theatre
 Himalayachi Savali
 Zopi Gelela Jaga Zala

References

External links
 

Living people
Marathi actors
Actresses in Marathi cinema
Indian television actresses
Indian film actresses
Actresses from Pune
21st-century Indian actresses
Actresses in Hindi cinema
Yoga therapists
Year of birth missing (living people)